Flambeau is the name of some places in the U.S. state of Wisconsin:

Flambeau, Price County, Wisconsin
Flambeau, Rusk County, Wisconsin